Eugene Hritzuk (born c. 1949) is a Canadian curler from Saskatoon, Saskatchewan.  He is a former World Senior men's champion skip.

Hritzuk has won two provincial championships as skip, once in 1985 and again in 1988. This qualified him for the Brier both times. At the 1985 Labatt Brier, he finished the round robin with a 6-5 record. He had to play in two tie-breakers, which he won to get to the semi-final, where he lost to Northern Ontario's Al Hackner. At the 1988 Labatt Brier, he finished the Brier with an 8-3 record, and lost to Alberta's Pat Ryan in the final. It would be his last Brier.

Since then, Hritzuk has been a successful seniors curler, and has represented Saskatchewan at the Canadian Seniors Championships in 2002, 2005, 2006, 2008, 2009 and 2012. He won his first Canadian Seniors Championship in 2008. Hritzuk won the World Senior Curling Championships in May 2009.  Hritzuk has also represented Saskatchewan at the Canadian Masters Curling Championships in 2010, 2012, 2013, 2014, 2016 and 2018 winning the Canadian Masters Championship in 2014.

References

External links
 

Living people
Curlers from Saskatoon
Canadian male curlers
Year of birth missing (living people)